Oratio ad Graecos, in English Discourse to the Greeks or Address to the Greeks, may refer to:

Discourse to the Greeks concerning Hades by Hippolytus of Rome
Oratio ad Graecos by Tatian
Oratio ad Graecos, erroneously attributed to Justin Martyr